Hydrolase is a class of enzyme that commonly perform as biochemical catalysts that use water to break a chemical bond, which typically results in dividing a larger molecule into smaller molecules. Some common examples of hydrolase enzymes are esterases including lipases, phosphatases, glycosidases, peptidases, and nucleosidases.

Esterases cleave ester bonds in lipids and phosphatases cleave phosphate groups off molecules. An example of crucial esterase is acetylcholine esterase, which assists in transforming the neuron impulse into the acetate group after the hydrolase breaks the acetylcholine into choline and acetic acid. Acetic acid is an important metabolite in the body and a critical intermediate for other reactions such as glycolysis. Lipases hydrolyze glycerides. Glycosidases cleave sugar molecules off carbohydrates and peptidases hydrolyze peptide bonds. Nucleosidases hydrolyze the bonds of nucleotides.

Hydrolase enzymes are important for the body because they have degradative properties. In lipids, lipases contribute to the breakdown of fats and lipoproteins and other larger molecules into smaller molecules like fatty acids and glycerol. Fatty acids and other small molecules are used for synthesis and as a source of energy.

In biochemistry, a hydrolase is an enzyme that catalyzes the hydrolysis of a chemical bond. For example, any enzyme that catalyzes the following reaction is a hydrolase:

A–B + H2O → A–OH + B–H

where A–B represents a chemical bond of unspecified molecules.

Nomenclature
Systematic names of hydrolases are formed as "substrate hydrolase." However, common names are typically in the form "substrate base". For example, a nuclease is a hydrolase that cleaves nucleic acids.

Classification
Hydrolases are classified as EC 3 in the EC number classification of enzymes. Hydrolases can be further classified into several subclasses, based upon the bonds they act upon:
EC 3.1: ester bonds (esterases: nucleases, phosphodiesterases, lipase, phosphatase)
EC 3.2: sugars (DNA glycosylases, glycoside hydrolase)
EC 3.3: ether bonds
EC 3.4: peptide bonds (Proteases/peptidases)
EC 3.5: carbon-nitrogen bonds, other than peptide bonds
EC 3.6 acid anhydrides (acid anhydride hydrolases, including helicases and GTPase)
EC 3.7 carbon-carbon bonds
EC 3.8 halide bonds
EC 3.9: phosphorus-nitrogen bonds
EC 3.10: sulphur-nitrogen bonds
EC 3.11: carbon-phosphorus bonds
EC 3.12: sulfur-sulfur bonds
EC 3.13: carbon-sulfur bonds

Clinical considerations
Hydrolase secreted by Lactobacillus jensenii in the human gut stimulates the liver to secrete bile salts that aids in the digestion of food.

Membrane-associated hydrolases
Many hydrolases, and especially proteases associate with biological membranes as peripheral membrane proteins or anchored through a single transmembrane helix. Some others are multi-span transmembrane proteins, for example rhomboid protease.

Etymology and pronunciation
The word hydrolase suffixes the combining form of -ase to the hydrol syllables of hydrolysis.

See also

Phosphorylase
Serine hydrolase

References

 EC 3 Introduction from the Department of Chemistry at Queen Mary, University of London, covers only 3.1-3.4
 More detailed taxonomy